The Abbey of Sainte-Trinité, better known as the Abbaye aux Dames, is a former nunnery in Caen, Normandy, now home to the Regional Council of Normandy. The complex includes the Church of Sainte-Trinité (the Holy Trinity).

History
The abbey was founded as a Benedictine nunnery in the late 11th century by William the Conqueror and his wife Matilda of Flanders as the Abbaye aux Dames ("Women's Abbey"), as well as the Abbaye aux Hommes ("Men's Abbey"), more formally the Abbey of Saint-Étienne. The works began in 1062, starting from the rear, and were completed in 1130. Matilda, who died in 1083, was buried in the choir under a slab of black marble.

William and Matilda's son, William II of England, also granted the abbey the manor of Horstead, in Norfolk, where Horstead Priory was established by the order, and continued until 1414.

The original spires were destroyed in the Hundred Years' War and replaced by less striking balustrades in the early 18th century. The nuns were dispersed, and the abbey was suppressed, in the French Revolution. In 1823 the town council decided to transfer the ancient  (possibly also founded by William the Conqueror, but more likely King Henry II of England), to the former monastic premises for use as a hospital, and the canonesses regular, who had assumed responsibility for the hospital from the two abbeys during the 14th century, established themselves there.

The vault was demolished and rebuilt in 1865. The church was last restored between 1990 and 1993.

Burials
Matilda of Flanders
Cecilia of Normandy

Architecture

The façade has two large towers at the sides, each with doors leading to the aisles. The pediment of the central bay echoes the nave roof. The tympanum of the central portal depicts the Trinity and the four apocalyptic beasts, symbols of the Four Evangelists.

The nave is surmounted by a gallery (triforium). Over the aisles is a groin vault, the first of this type built in Normandy (1130). The transept, in the centre of the church, houses the main altar. The northern transept is in Romanesque style, opening over a small apse (the chapel of the Blessed Sacrament) which houses the tabernacle. The southern transept is characterised by Gothic columns integrated within the Romanesque decoration.

The choir ends with an apse decorated by four columns and a gallery with fantastic figures. Also present is a crypt in honour of Saint Nicholas.

References

External links

  Abbaye-aux-Dames en Basse-Normandie
 Abbaye aux Dames
 High-resolution 360° Panoramas and Images of the Abbey of Sainte-Trinité | Art Atlas

Sainte-Trinite
Sainte-Trinite, Caen
Sainte-Trinite, Caen
Sainte-Trinite, Caen
Augustinian monasteries in France
Sainte-Trinite, Caen
1908 disestablishments
Romanesque architecture in Normandy
11th-century establishments in France
Burial sites of the House of Normandy
Abbey of Sainte-Trinité
12th-century Roman Catholic church buildings in France